The 61st Pioneers were an infantry regiment of the British Indian Army. They trace their origins to, when they were raised as the 1st Battalion Coast Sepoys.

History 
The regiment took part in the Carnatic Wars in 1746–1763 and then the Third Anglo-Mysore War.
In the Fourth Anglo-Mysore War they took part in the Battle of Seedaseer, the Battle of Seringapatam, the Battle of Nagpore, the Battle of Ava. They were next in action during the Indian Rebellion of 1857 in the Central India Campaign. Their next campaigns were outside  India when they took part in the Second Afghan War, the Second Burmese War and the Boxer Rebellion.
During World War I they were part of the 9th (Secunderabad) Division in the 27th Bangalore Brigade. This brigade served away from its parent division and served in British East Africa as part of the Indian Expeditionary Force B. After returning to India they took part in the Third Afghan War.

After World War I the Indian government reformed the army moving from single battalion regiments to multi battalion regiments. In , the 61st Pioneers now became the 1st Battalion 1st Madras Pioneers, which was disbanded in 1933.

Lineage
1st Battalion Coast Sepoys - 1758
1st Carnatic Battalion - 1769
1st Madras Battalion - 1784
1st Battalion, 1st Madras Native Infantry - 1796
1st Madras Native Infantry - 1824 
1st Madras Native Infantry (Pioneers) - 1883
1st Madras Infantry (Pioneers) - 1885
1st Madras Pioneers - 1901 
61st Madras Pioneers - 1903
61st Prince of Wales's Own Pioneers - 1906
61st King George's Own Pioneers - 1910

References

Sources

Moberly, F.J. (1923). Official History of the War: Mesopotamia Campaign, Imperial War Museum. 

British Indian Army infantry regiments
Military history of the Madras Presidency
Military units and formations established in 1758
Military units and formations disestablished in 1922